Jabberwock: a Monthly Magazine for Boys and Girls was published in London by Chapman & Hall and edited by Brenda Girvin. Price 6d 1905 - 1907
 
Originally The Jabberwock, the title became Our Jabberwock from August 1906 onwards.

Vol 1 No 3 (October 1905) contained The Princess and the Cat by E. Nesbit.

The First Issue of the magazine contained:
The Little Marquis by Shiela Braine
Stanley and the pigmies by Alice Corkran
Wonderful Adventures by Robert Murray Gilchrist
The Enchanted Garden by Netta Syrett
Curious Shells by the Rev. T. Wood

References

Children's magazines published in the United Kingdom
Chapman & Hall books
Defunct magazines published in the United Kingdom
Magazines published in London
Magazines established in 1905
Magazines disestablished in 1907
1905 establishments in England